Creacombe is a small village and former civil parish, now in the parish of Rackenford in the North Devon district of Devon, England. In 1961 the civil parish had a population of 52. On the 1 April 1986 the civil parish was merged with Rackenford.

References 

Villages in Devon
Former civil parishes in Devon
North Devon